Words Upon the Window Pane is a 1994 Irish drama film directed by Mary McGuckian and starring Geraldine Chaplin, Ian Richardson, and Jim Sheridan. McGuckian directorial debut, it is based on  William Butler Yeats' one-act play of the same name. Pat O'Connor was billed to direct the project but he personally offered McGuckian, who was writing the screenplay at the time, the opportunity to also direct. The film received its US premiere on 10 June 1994 at the Lincoln Center for the Performing Arts as part of the largest retrospective of Irish film ever shown outside Ireland. In September that year, the film was screened at the 51st Venice International Film Festival.

Premise
In 1928 Dublin, during séances concerning Jonathan Swift, the spirits of his former lovers, Stella and Vanessa, emerge to resume their ancient quarrel.

Cast
Geraldine Chaplin as Miss McKenna
Ian Richardson as Dr. Trench
Jim Sheridan as Jonathan Swift/Dean Swift
Geraldine James as Mrs. Henderson
Orla Brady as Vanessa. 
John Lynch as John Corbet
Gerard McSorley as Abraham Johnson
Donal Donnelly as Cornelius Patterson 
Gemma Craven as Mrs. Mallet
Brid Brennan as Stella 
Hugh O'Conor as Cabin boy

References

External links
 

1994 films
Irish drama films
Films set in the 1920s
Irish films based on plays
1994 drama films
Adaptations of works by W. B. Yeats
1994 directorial debut films
1990s English-language films